Telapak is a non-profit organisation involved in reporting on illegal logging in Indonesia’s national parks to raise awareness of the issue, both internationally and domestically.

References

External links 
 Official Website

Forestry in Indonesia
Forest conservation organizations